99.7 Core FM (DWIA 99.7 MHz) is an FM station in the Philippines owned and operated by Iddes Broadcast Group. Its studios and transmitter are located in Marinella Commercial Complex, Bantay, Ilocos Sur.

References

External links
Core FM FB Page

Radio stations in Ilocos Sur
Radio stations established in 2012